Spitting spiders (Scytodidae) is a family of 	araneomorph spiders first described by John Blackwall in 1864. It contains over 250 species in five genera, of which Scytodes is the best-known.

Description
Like recluse spiders and coneweb spiders, they have six eyes arranged in three pairs and are haplogyne, meaning they have less complex female genitalia. They differ from these families in having a dome-shaped carapace and in their characteristic flecked pattern of spots.

Hunting technique
Scytodidae catch their prey by spitting a fluid that congeals on contact into a venomous and sticky mass. The fluid contains both venom and spider silk in liquid form, though it is produced in venom glands in the chelicerae. The venom-laced silk both immobilizes and envenoms prey such as silverfish. In high-speed footage the spiders can be observed swaying from side to side as they "spit", catching the prey in a criss-crossed "Z" pattern; it is criss-crossed because each of the chelicerae emits half of the pattern. After making the capture, the spider typically bites the prey with venomous effect, and wraps it in the normal spider fashion with silk from the spinnerets.

Presocial behaviour
Some species exhibit presocial behaviour, in which mature spiders live together and assist the young with food.

Genera

, the World Spider Catalog accepts the following genera:

Dictis L. Koch, 1872 — Asia, Australia
Scyloxes Dunin, 1992 — Tajikistan
Scytodes Latreille, 1804 — South America, Africa, Asia, North America, Caribbean, Central America, Oceania, Spain
Soeuria Saaristo, 1997 — Seychelles
Stedocys Ono, 1995 — China, Malaysia, Thailand

See also
 List of Scytodidae species

References

External links
 Arachnology Home Pages: Araneae
 Info about Spitting spider Scytodes thoracica
 Platnick, N.I. 2003. World Spider Catalog